County routes in Fulton County, New York, are signed with the Manual on Uniform Traffic Control Devices-standard yellow-on-blue pentagon route marker. Road names are given where available; however, some routes are known only by their county route designation, especially those located in the rural northern portion of the county that lies within Adirondack Park.

Routes 101–130

Routes 131 and up

See also

County routes in New York

References

External links